The 2019 U Sports Men's University Cup Hockey Tournament (57th annual) was held March 14–17, 2019, in Lethbridge, Alberta and played at the ENMAX Centre. The Lethbridge Pronghorns, a member of U Sports Canada West conference, are the designated host for this awarded year. The ENMAX center is located 15 minutes from campus, in south Lethbridge. This event marks the first appearance of the tournament in Lethbridge and 10th time in Alberta (7 times in Edmonton and 2 times in Calgary).

The New Brunswick Reds won their 8th title over the defending champion Alberta Golden Bears. UNB last won the University Cup in 2017. This marked only the 2nd victory for an Atlantic program in 10 trips to Alberta (the other victory was Moncton, in 1981, hosted by Calgary).

The tournament format remained unchanged: 8 teams, single elimination and Bronze medal games, with 3 conference champions, 3 conference runner-ups, OUA Bronze winner and host.

Road to the Cup

AUS playoffs

OUA playoffs

Note 1: The Queen's Cup championship game must be held in Ontario (part of the arrangement when the RSEQ hockey league merged with the OUA). When a Quebec-based OUA-East representative is the higher seed and should 'host' the game - the game shall be hosted by the OUA-West team instead, but the OUA-East team shall be the 'home' team and have last change.

Note 2: Queen's forfeited a Feb. 9 regular season game against McGill after it was determined they dressed an ineligible player. The subsequent loss and adjusted record would relegate Queen's to the 4th seed (previously 3rd), while McGill promoted to #3 (previously 4th). However, due to the late determination of this foul (two hours before the start of the first round of the playoffs) - it was determined that the opening round matchups would remain unchanged. Going forward into the second round, the two teams (if they advanced) would be reseeded accordingly.

Canada West playoffs

University Cup Tournament
The eight teams to advance to the tournament are listed below. The three conference champions must be seeded 1-3 based on the pre-tournament Top 10 Rankings followed by the OUA Runner-up (seed #4). The remaining four seeds are for the AUS Finalist, Canada West Finalist, OUA Third-place and host. Their seedings are based on the pre-tournament rankings. 

Further Information in the tournament preview: University Cup

Tournament format
The tournament is a traditional 8 team, single elimination ladder with bronze medal game between the two semi-final losers. Games that are tied after regulation play a 10-minute overtime period following the 3rd period. If there is no score after the first overtime, the ice is cleaned and they would play 20 minute periods (with ice cleaned between periods) until there is a winner.

The higher seed is the 'Home' team for each game (the home team must wear their 'white' jerseys and will get the last change during stoppages of play).

Championship Bronze

Championship final

Tournament All-Stars
Alex Dubeau, from the UNB Reds, was selected as the Major W.J. 'Danny' McLeod Award for U Sports University Cup MVP. Dubeau played all three games for UNB (Game 1 MVP versus Carleton) and finished the tournament with a GAA of 1.33 and Save Percentage of 0.948.

Joining Dubeau on the tournament all-star team were:
Forward: Kris Bennett (UNB Reds)
Forward: Christopher Clapperton (UNB Reds)
Forward: Luke Philp (Alberta Golden Bears)Defenseman: Marcus McIvor (UNB Reds)
Defenseman: Jason Fram (Alberta Golden Bears)

See also
2019 U Sports Women's Ice Hockey Championship

References

External links
 Tournament Website

U Sports ice hockey
Ice hockey in Alberta
University Cup, 2019
Sport in Lethbridge